The Albert H. Kelly House, at 418 South 200 West in Salt Lake City, Utah, was an Italianate house that was built in 1884 and demolished in the spring of 2021 to make way for an apartment complex.  It was listed on the National Register of Historic Places in 1983.

In 1983, its NRHP nomination asserted it to be "the best extant example in Utah of the vernacular form of the Italianate style which appeared in increasing numbers from the 1870s to the 1890s."

References

Houses on the National Register of Historic Places in Utah
Italianate architecture in Utah
Houses completed in 1884
Houses in Salt Lake City
National Register of Historic Places in Salt Lake City